Tunde Olaniran is a musician from Flint, Michigan. In 2014, Olaniran released their first EP titled Yung Archetype (see: Jungian archetypes). Olaniran released their first full-length album in 2015 titled Transgressor. In 2018, Olaniran released their second full-length album titled Stranger. Olaniran is gender nonconforming, and their pronouns are they/them. They are an American of Nigerian descent.

Discography

Studio albums

EPs

Singles

References

External links
 

Living people
Musicians from Flint, Michigan
Non-binary musicians
Year of birth missing (living people)
American people of Nigerian descent
Singers from Michigan
Nigerian non-binary people